Euphorbia cooperi is a flowering plant in the Euphorbiaceae family. It is commonly called Transvaal candelabra tree or bushveld candelabra euphorbia, and is found in South Africa.

References

cooperi
Taxa named by Alwin Berger
Taxa named by N. E. Brown